Wesley Gilbert (born 22 October 1977) is a retired Zimbabwean football defender.

References

1977 births
Living people
Zimbabwean footballers
Zimbabwe international footballers
Dynamos F.C. players
Association football defenders